Robert "Robbie" Busscher (born 23 November 1982) is a Dutch former professional footballer who played as a midfielder from 2001 to 2006.

Busscher played for Grimsby Town, Stormvogels Telstar, SC Feyenoord, ADO Den Haag and RBC Roosendaal before switching sports to compete in futsal where he previously played for FC Tutor.

Playing career

Football
As a youngster Busscher played for Feyenoord and appeared for the Netherlands at U19 level. In 2001, he secured a move to English club Grimsby Town, joining on a free transfer along with fellow Feyenoord youngster Ronald Ermes. Busscher featured once for Grimsby, coming on as a substitute for fellow countryman Menno Willems in the 89th minute of a 1–0 victory over West Bromwich Albion at The Hawthorns.

If chances were limited under Lennie Lawrence, they were non-existent under new manager Paul Groves. Busscher and Ermes were released in January 2002. The pair returned to the Netherlands and signed with SC Feyenoord an amateur sister club connected to Feyenoord.

Futsal
Busscher now plays Futsal for FC Tutor Delft in his home country.

References

1982 births
Living people
People from Leidschendam
Association football midfielders
Dutch footballers
Feyenoord players
Grimsby Town F.C. players
SC Telstar players
ADO Den Haag players
RBC Roosendaal players
Dutch expatriate footballers
Expatriate footballers in England
Dutch expatriate sportspeople in England
English Football League players
Dutch men's futsal players
SC Feyenoord players
Footballers from South Holland